Ernst Peter Jurgen Schildt (born 9 June 1951 in Stockholm) is a Swedish actor, screenwriter, film director, theatre director, etc. Schildt began acting at Vår teater, a children's theatre in Stockholm, as a child. He participated in theatre and in TV and radio throughout his schooling.

He is the son of actor Henrik Schildt and of Margareta. His is the brother of Johan Schildt, also an actor and a writer. Schildt was previously married to Christina Herrström.

Filmography

Film
Den gula bilen (1963)
Ådalen 31 (1969)
The Shot (1969)
Games of Love and Loneliness (1977)
Lycka till (1980), director
Flight of the Eagle (1982)
Gräsänklingar (1982)
Amorosa (1986)
The Christmas Oratorio (1996)
Suxxess (2000), director, screenwriter
Distant Land (2010), actor
Tusen gånger starkare (2010), director
Svensson, Svensson: i nöd och lust (2011)

Television
August Strindberg: Ett liv (1985)
Xerxes (1988), director
Tre kärlekar (1989)
Ebba & Didrik (1990), director
Glappet (1997), director
Ivar Kreuger (1999)
Kronprinsessan (2006)
Sommer (2008)
Oskyldigt dömd (2008)
Crimes of Passion (2013), director

References

External links

Swedish Film Database

Male actors from Stockholm
1951 births
Living people
Swedish male film actors
Swedish screenwriters
Swedish male screenwriters
Swedish film directors
Swedish theatre directors
Swedish male television actors
Swedish male child actors
20th-century Swedish male actors
21st-century Swedish male actors